Shirley railway station serves the Shirley area of Solihull in the West Midlands of England. Situated on the North Warwickshire Line, the station, and all trains serving it, are operated by West Midlands Trains.

History
The station was opened by the Great Western Railway on 1 June 1908, along with the line. It was considered an important station and was provided with substantial brick built buildings. The station was also provided with a goods yard and shed, which lasted until 1968.

Until October 2010, Shirley station was the terminus for many commuter services from Birmingham which did not run through to Stratford. These services were extended to terminate at the next station , with the commissioning of a new turnback facility. This was done in order to alleviate traffic congestion at Shirley station, by encouraging commuters to drive to Whitlocks End, which had space for proper park and ride facilities. The 1907 built signalbox that stood on the Stratford-upon-Avon bound platform became redundant, and was demolished at the end of 2010, despite a local campaign to see its retention.

Services
During Monday to Saturday daytimes:

 3 trains per hour northbound to Birmingham Moor Street and Birmingham Snow Hill continuing to Stourbridge Junction, with some trains continuing onward to Kidderminster and Worcester.  

On Sundays, there is an hourly service to  via Birmingham Snow Hill and to Stratford-upon-Avon.

References

External links

Rail Around Birmingham and the West Midlands: Shirley railway station
Railways of Warwickshire entry

Railway stations in Solihull
DfT Category E stations
Former Great Western Railway stations
Railway stations in Great Britain opened in 1908
Railway stations served by West Midlands Trains
1908 establishments in England